Mr. Bharath is a 1986 Indian Tamil-language masala film directed by S. P. Muthuraman. The film stars Rajinikanth, Sathyaraj and Ambika. A remake of the Hindi film Trishul, it revolves around a son's revenge against his father for cheating on his mother. The film was released on 10 January 1986.

Plot 

Bharath is a young, educated man, unaware on the whereabouts of his father. Shanti, his mother, tells him the past about his father, but, on her deathbed.

Flashback: A young Gopinath, suave, educated and a rich man, arrives Paarapatti village (where then-young Shanti resides), for engineering a construction project. Over time, he slowly gains her interest, for her being an innocent village girl she was, working under him as a manual construction labour under his unit, by emulating innocence. Smitten, she, in turn, entrusts him, wherein he takes the fullest advantage over her. After the construction work Gopinath was engineering for, finished the final stage, he goes about to move out of the Paarapatti. Getting to know his departure, Shanti runs into him. Gopinath justifies her that he would return soon to take over her arms which convinces Shanti as she waved him off gleefully. Weeks passed, Shanti, self-acquiesced she's conceived, eagerly and desperately awaiting Gopinath to return expecting the promise he lent, be fulfilled, hears from fellow villagers that he was about to get wed to another rich woman. Shocked, she travels to Madras with the help of the visiting card that Gopinath had given her earlier to meet him. They both have a furious heads-up after Gopinath, who not only portrayed his original ill-natured attire but expressed a denial too — indicating the difference in their stature and her archaic-in-nature, to accept her. Also stating she had no proof regarding intimacy that made her conceive, berates her a 'gold-digger'. Become aware of the innocence as a cloak that he used for exploiting her, which he himself admits at the end, exasperates Shanti furiously. An insulted Shanti swore him that one day her child will question him on the future of his vile actions and make him forcibly confess the truth about his depraved activity in front of the whole society and departs. Over the course of time, Shanti faces hardships and raises her son to be what he becomes as now not revealing her past until her last hour.

Back to the Present, She makes Bharath promise to fulfil her challenge before last breath. Bharath, anguished having lost his mother, takes up her vow as a challenge of making his biological father confess the truth within next year 31 August, the day he lost his mother, at her first remembrance.

Bharath leaves for the city and meets his biological father, Gopinath, as some strange man not revealing his true, real identity. After a business dealing, Bharath uses a brilliant, yet criminal strategy, to extricate money out of Gopinath which he uses as an investment to start his own business by venturing into the construction sector and rises to No 2 company within months keeping Gopinath's construction company, 'Gopinath constructions', which was the No.1 company in the same field, as his target. This angers Gopinath, as a result of which, Gopinath views Bharath as a strategic business enemy. Both Bharath and Gopinath try to overtake each other in an illegitimate way. Bharath however, hardworking and brilliant, also with the help of Sanjeevi (Goundamani), his local trustee, out cuts all chances and goes to make his company outrank Gopinath constructions to No.2 thus, becoming No 1.

Later Bharath once helps a girl from goons and takes to her home only to find out that the girl is Pushpa, Gopinath's daughter who happens to be his step-sister. Due to this, Bharath wins the affection of Mrs. Gopinath (Who happens to be Bharath's stepmother) who starts to treat her like her own son, similar to Pushpa's brother. Bharath tactically arranges for a marriage of Pushpa with the son of a wealthy man Kumeresa Gounder on 31 August, the first remembrance of his mother. Kumaresa Goundar fully is made aware of Bharath's swearing, so he too helps him to fulfil the challenge which he has against Gopinath. Bharath also uses the love connection between his rich born step-brother and austere Sanjeevi's sister to corner status-minded Gopinath by arranging the marriage on the same 31 August. Bharath uses every possible way to torture Gopinath to make him realise his mistake but Gopinath does not reciprocate instead becomes angrier as things go beyond business to personal vengeance. Bharath tactically makes various bottlenecks for Gopinath on Aug-31st, as Gopinath comes to realise that there is more than business Bharath was taking this plight into.

Having lost his clutch with business, wealth and status, Gopinath slowly goes into bankruptcy thus unable to afford to his own children' wedding. In the meanwhile, Bharath invites him to inaugurate his orphanage on 31 August, the date when he planned to fulfil his mother's wish. Gopinath, furious with Bharath since he is the reason for his slump, hires a local goon Michael (Raghuvaran) who once was his enemy (also Bharath's) and proposes to kill Bharath at his own inaugural function on the same 31 August. Bharath reveals his mother's identity in the function as he waits for Gopinath to accept his mistake.

Mrs. Gopinath inaugrates the statue of Bharath's mother. Upon seeing the statue in shock Gopinath realises Bharath is his son. With a change of heart Gopinath tries to save Bharath from getting shot from Michael only to be gotten shot in his shoulder. Gopinath publicly declares and apologises that Bharath is his son. Both father son duo thrashes Michael and reunites. Kumaresa Gounder handovers Michael to police. With a happy note, Gopinath asks Bharath to make him a grandfather within August 31 next year to sever his pride of status, money minded attitude in a loving way..

Cast 
 Rajinikanth as Bharath
 Sathyaraj as Gopinath
 Ambika as Uma
 Sharada as Shanti
 Goundamani as Sanjeevi
 S. Ve. Shekhar as Ashok
 Raghuvaran as Michael
 Visu as Kumerasa Gounder
 Deepan
 Viji as Ponni
 Vadivukkarasi  as Gopinath's wife
 Jothichandra  as Pushpa
 Delhi Ganesh as construction contractor
 LIC Narasimhan

Production 
Sathyaraj acted as Rajinikanth's father in the film though he was in fact four years younger than Rajinikanth. AVM Saravanan cast Raghuvaran after being impressed with his performance in Police... Police. According to Saravanan, the dialogue "Ennamma Kannu" spoken by Sathyaraj was taken from G. Anand, who owned Little Anand Theatre who often used this line.

Music 
The music was composed by Ilaiyaraaja. The track "Ennama Kannu" was later remixed by D. Imman in the film Thiruvilaiyaadal Aarambam (2006). The title was also used for a 2000 film also starring Sathyaraj.

Release and reception 
Mr. Bharath was released on 10 January 1986, the week of Pongal. Jeyamanmadhan of Kalki appreciated Rajinikanth and Sathyaraj's performances, but criticised that of Ambika.

References

Bibliography

External links 

1980s masala films
1980s Tamil-language films
1986 films
AVM Productions films
Films directed by S. P. Muthuraman
Films scored by Ilaiyaraaja
Films with screenplays by Visu
Tamil remakes of Hindi films